The 1971 New Zealand Grand Prix was a race held at the Pukekohe Park Raceway on 9 January 1971.  The race had 20 starters.

It was the 17th New Zealand Grand Prix, and doubled as the second round of the 1971 Tasman Series.  Australian Neil Allen won his first NZGP in his McLaren Formula 5000 ahead of fellow Australian and previous years winner, Frank Matich. The first New Zealand driver to finish was Graham McRae in the McLaren Formula 5000.

Classification

References

Grand Prix
New Zealand Grand Prix
Tasman Series
January 1971 sports events in New Zealand